Two Weeks is a 1920 American silent film production and directed by Sidney Franklin. It starred Constance Talmadge and was produced by her brother-in-law Joseph Schenck. It was distributed through First National Exhibitors.

Cast
 Constance Talmadge - 
 Conway Tearle - 
 Reginald Mason
 George Fawcett
 Templar Saxe
 William Frederic
 Tom Cameron

Preservation status
The film is preserved in the Library of Congress collection and UCLA Film & Television Archive.

References

External links 

1920 films
Films directed by Sidney Franklin
American silent feature films
1920s English-language films
American black-and-white films
1920s American films
Silent American comedy-drama films